The Ruhmeshalle (literally "hall of fame") is a Doric colonnade with a main range and two wings, designed by Leo von Klenze for Ludwig I of Bavaria. Built in 1853, it is situated on an ancient ledge above the Theresienwiese in Munich and was built as part of a complex which also includes the Bavariapark and the Bavaria statue. It is built of Kelheim limestone and is 68 metres long and 32 metres deep.

With the construction and exhibition of busts of important people from Bavaria, including the Palatinate, Franconia and Swabia, King Ludwig intended to create a hall of fame that honors laudable and distinguished people of his kingdom, as he did also in the Walhalla memorial for all of Germany.

See also
 Befreiungshalle (Hall of Liberation, Kelheim, Germany)
 Heldenberg Memorial (Austria)
 Hermannsdenkmal (Hermann monument, Teutoburg Forest, Germany)

References

External links

Bayerische Schlösserverwaltung on the Ruhmeshalle
Panorama of the Ruhmeshalle and the Bavaria statue

Buildings and structures in Munich
Leo von Klenze buildings